WellieWishers is an animated web series based on the American Girl doll franchise. The series premiered on October 14, 2016 on Amazon Prime Video in the United States and Spain, and subsequently aired on Televisa, plus Tiny Pop in the United Kingdom. The series is co-produced by Mattel Creations and Submarine Studios B.V. and animated by Jam Filled Entertainment.

The series features five six and seven-year-old girls: Willa, Camille, Emerson, Kendall and Ashlyn. Each girl wears a pair of colourful Wellington boots as they play in Willa's Aunt Miranda's garden.

Characters 

Ashlyn (voiced by Dana Heath): The group's party planner and the most socially-active among the girls.
Camille (voiced by Ashley Gebhard): A caring young girl and a good listener, who has an affinity for the ocean and aquatic interests.
Emerson (voiced by Lola Salsbury Lipson): The theatrically-inclined member of the group, enjoying the stage and performing in front of her friends through her self-written poems and songs.
Kendall (voiced by Yasmine Wright-Capers): The group's artist and designer, having a gift for arts, crafts, and recycling old or discarded things.
Willa (voiced by Lily Sanfelippo): A tree-climber and nature lover who has an interest in the outdoors, making friends with animals, and being fluent in "rabbit language".

Episodes

Season 1 (2016)
 The Bothersome Bird
 Little Tree
 Snow-flaking
 Copy Cat
 Butterfly Ballet
 Glowing in the Dark
 I Do, You, Hair-Do
 Now You See It, Now You Don't
 It Takes Two to See-Saw
 Coloriffic Scavenger Hunt
 Ashyln's Tall Tale
 Anything for a Laugh
 The Rainmakers

Season 2 (2017)
 Kendall Rules the Roost
 All Times Favorites
 Out of Line
 Camille's Poem
 Honking in the Winter Wonderland 
 All's Wellie That Ends Wellie
 Duck, Duck, Oops!
 Truth or Hare
 Honey, I Spoiled The Bunny
 Owie Zowie
 The Party That Blew Away
 Mighty Girl
 The Importance of Being Ashlyn

References 

2016 American television series debuts
2017 American television series endings
2010s American animated television series
2016 Canadian television series debuts
2017 Canadian television series endings
2010s Canadian animated television series
2016 Dutch television series debuts
2017 Dutch television series endings
American Girl
American children's animated fantasy television series
American children's animated musical television series
Animated television series about children
Canadian children's animated fantasy television series
Canadian children's animated musical television series
English-language television shows
Dutch children's animated fantasy television series
Television series by Mattel Creations
Television shows based on toys